This is a list of members of the Victorian Legislative Council between 1961 and 1964. As half of the Legislative Council's terms expired at each triennial election, half of these members were elected at the 1958 triennial election with terms expiring in 1964, while the other half were elected at the 1961 state election with terms expiring in 1967.

The 1961 election was the first conjoint election for the Legislative Assembly and half of the Legislative Council; from that point forward, the triennial election for the Council and the general election for the Assembly would always be held on the same day, although this was not provided for automatically until 1984.

 The 1943 state election and the 1943 triennial election were both held on 12 June 1943, and the same took place in 1904; however, these were not conjoint elections, as until 1950 the two elections had different franchise and separate rolls. See 
 On 20 June 1963, Buckley Machin, Labor MLC for Melbourne West Province, died. Labor candidate Alexander Knight won the resulting by-election on 10 August 1963.
 On 18 January 1964, Ewen Paul Cameron, Liberal MLC for East Yarra Province, died. Liberal candidate Bill Campbell won the resulting by-election on 14 March 1964.

Sources
 Re-member (a database of all Victorian MPs since 1851). Parliament of Victoria.
 Victorian Year Book 1954–58

Members of the Parliament of Victoria by term
20th-century Australian politicians